Aleksey Andreevich Tupolev (20 May 1925 – 12 May 2001) was a Soviet and later Russian aircraft designer who led the development of the first supersonic passenger jet, the Tupolev Tu-144. He also helped design the Buran space shuttle and the long-range heavy bomber Tu-2000, both of which were suspended for lack of funding.

Biography 
Aleksey Andreevich Tupolev was born on 20 May 1925 in Moscow. He was the son of the famed Soviet aircraft pioneer Andrei Tupolev.

Aleksey worked at the Tupolev Design Bureau in 1942–1949 as a factory designer. He graduated from the Moscow Aviation Institute in 1949. 

During Soviet leader Khrushchev's visit to the U.S. in September 1959, he insisted on taking Tu-114 despite that its maiden long-distance flight only occurred in May. In order to guarantee the safety, Aleksey Tupolev was sent by his father Andrei, along as a sign of his confidence in the plane. Khrushchev later said, "We didn't publicize the fact that Tupolev's son was with us" for "to do so would have meant giving explanations, and these might have been damaging to our image". 

In 1961 was born his son Andrey Alekseevich Tupolev.

Aleksey became chief designer of Tupolev Design Bureau in 1963 and general designer in 1973.

Aleksey Tupolev died on 12 May 2001. He was buried in Moscow.

Projects 

 Tupolev Tu-134  is a twin-engined, jet airliner built in the Soviet Union for short and medium-haul routes from 1966 to 1989.
 Tupolev Tu-144 is a Soviet supersonic passenger airliner.
 Tupolev Tu-154 is a three-engined, medium-range, airliner designed in the mid-1960s.
 Tupolev Tu-160  is a supersonic heavy strategic bomber.
 Tupolev Tu-204 is a twin-engined medium-range narrow-body jet airliner.
 "Buran" was the first spaceplane to be produced as part of the Soviet/Russian Buran programme.
 Tupolev Tu-123 Yastreb  was one of the earliest Soviet reconnaissance drones.
 Tupolev Tu-142 is a Soviet/Russian maritime reconnaissance and anti-submarine warfare (ASW) aircraft.

References

Tupolev
1925 births
2001 deaths
Heroes of Socialist Labour
Moscow Aviation Institute alumni
Soviet aerospace engineers
Full Members of the USSR Academy of Sciences
Full Members of the Russian Academy of Sciences
Soviet inventors